The 1985 Illinois Fighting Illini football team was an American football team that represented the University of Illinois at Urbana-Champaign during the 1985 Big Ten Conference football season. In their sixth year under head coach Mike White, the Illini compiled a 6–5–1 record and finished in third place in the Big Ten Conference. Illinois was invited to the Peach Bowl, where the Illini lost to Army.

The team's offensive leaders were quarterback Jack Trudeau with 2,938 passing yards, running back Thomas Rooks with 718 rushing yards, and wide receiver David Williams with 1,047 receiving yards.

Schedule

Game summaries

No. 6 USC

    
    
    
    
    
    

In a game that some considered a possible Rose Bowl preview, the Illini were doomed by 6 turnovers and found themselves in a 14–0 very early in the game. Illinois pulled to within 20–10 on a Chris White field goal early in the fourth quarter, but USC used ball control to grind out the clock – including 22 minutes of possession in the second half – and gain a big road win in the season opener for both teams.

at No. 18 Nebraska

No. 5 Ohio State

at Michigan State

Wisconsin

No. 4 Michigan

On November 2, 1985, Illinois played Michigan to a 3–3 tie at Memorial Stadium.  Each team kicked a field goal in the third quarter. In the fourth quarter, Michigan drove the length of the field, but fullback Gerald White fumbled at the Illinois 12-yard line, with the Illini recovering at the nine-yard line.  Illinois then drove the length of the field and, with time running out, Chris White lined up for what would have been a game-winning 37-yard field goal.  Dieter Heren tipped the ball, which hit the cross-bar and bounced back, and the game ended in a tie.  After the game, head coach White said, "I don't remember feeling worse after a game. . . . I'm devastated."

at No. 6 Iowa

vs. Army (Peach Bowl)

References

Illinois
Illinois Fighting Illini football seasons
Illinois Fighting Illini football